"So Be It" is a song recorded by British singer Lisa Stansfield for her 2014 album, Seven. It was written by Stansfield and her husband Ian Devaney, and produced by Devaney. "So Be It" was announced as the third single on 27 March 2014 and premiered on Terry Wogan's BBC Radio 2 show on 30 March 2014. The music video premiered on 3 May 2014. "So Be It" was set for the release in the United Kingdom on 5 May 2014. The song was remixed by Cahill and Soul Talk (Ernie McKone and Toby Baker). Both remixes were included on the re-release of Seven, titled Seven+. Stansfield performed the song during her Seven Tour. On 24 February 2015, "So Be It" and "There Goes My Heart" were released as a double A-side 7" single in the United Kingdom.

Track listings
Promotional single
"So Be It" (Radio Mix)

7" single
"So Be It" (SoulTalk Remix) – 4:11
"There Goes My Heart" (SoulTalk Remix)

Other remixes
"So Be It" (Cahill Club Mix) – 6:09
"So Be It" (Cahill Radio Edit) – 3:44

Credits and personnel

Songwriting – Lisa Stansfield, Ian Devaney
Production – Ian Devaney
Mixing – Peter Mokran
Engineers – Stephen Boyce-Buckley, Jay Glover, Robbie Nelson
Piano – Ian Devaney
Hammond – Dave Oliver
Percussion – Snowboy
Guitars – Al Cherry
Drums – Davide Giovannini
Bass – Gary Crockett
Trumpets and flugelhorn – John Thirkell
Saxophones and flute – Mickey Donnelly
Harp – Hugh Webb
Background vocals – Andrea Grant, Lisa Stansfield
Strings – The London Telefilmonic Orchestra 
Horns arrangement – John Thirkell, Ian Devaney
Strings arrangement and conductor – Richard Cottle

Release history

References

Lisa Stansfield songs
LGBT-related songs
2014 singles
2014 songs
Songs written by Lisa Stansfield
Songs written by Ian Devaney